This list of geology awards is an index to articles on notable awards for geology, an earth science concerned with the solid Earth, the rocks of which it is composed, and the processes by which they change over time. Geology can also include the study of the solid features of any terrestrial planet or natural satellite such as Mars or the Moon. 
The list is organized by region and country of the organization that sponsors the award, but awards are not always restricted to people from that country.
See list of earth sciences awards for awards for earth sciences in general, and for other branches of earth science.

Americas

Canada

Chile

United States

Europe

Other regions

See also

 Lists of awards
 Lists of science and technology awards
 List of earth sciences awards
 List of geography awards
 List of geophysics awards

References

 
Geology